Chingarora Creek is a tributary of Keyport Harbor in Monmouth County, New Jersey in the United States.

Chingarora Creek's source is in Hazlet Township, flowing north into Keyport Harbor, an arm of Raritan Bay.

See also
List of rivers of New Jersey

Rivers of Monmouth County, New Jersey
Rivers of New Jersey